Amponsem is a surname. Notable people with the surname include:

 Boa Amponsem I (or Boamponsem) (died 1694), omanhene
 Odeefuo Boa Amponsem III (born 1932), omanhene
 Kwabena Boa-Amponsem known as Koo Nimo (born 1934), Ghanaian folk musician